Frederick William Kavanaugh (September 10, 1871 in Waterford, Saratoga County, New York – December 2, 1940 in Waterford, Saratoga Co., NY) was an American businessman and politician from New York.

Life
He was the son of Luke Kavanaugh (born 1830 in Dublin) and Mary Monaghan. On December 9, 1891, he married Lillian May LeRoy (1871–1921), and they had two children.

He was Supervisor of the Town of Waterford in 1903; and Sheriff of Saratoga County from 1904 to 1906.

Kavanaugh was a member of the New York State Senate (32nd D.) from 1921 to 1924, sitting in the 144th, 145th, 146th and 147th New York State Legislatures.

He committed suicide on December 2, 1940, at his home in Waterford, New York, by shooting himself.

Assemblyman George W. Kavanaugh (born c. 1863) was his brother.

Notes

1871 births
1940 deaths
Republican Party New York (state) state senators
People from Waterford, New York
Suicides by firearm in New York (state)
Sheriffs of Saratoga County, New York
Town supervisors in New York (state)
American politicians who committed suicide